The pommel horse is an artistic gymnastics event held at the Summer Olympics. The event was first held for men at the first modern Olympics in 1896. It was held again in 1904, but not in 1900, 1908, 1912, or 1920 when no apparatus events were awarded medals. The pommel horse was one of the components of the men's artistic individual all-around in 1900, however. The men's pommel horse returned as a medal event in 1924 and has been held every Games since. Pommel horse scores were included in the individual all-around for 1924 and 1928, with no separate apparatus final. In 1932, the pommel horse was entirely separate from the all-around. From 1936 to 1956, there were again no separate apparatus finals with the pommel horse scores used in the all-around. Beginning in 1960, there were separate apparatus finals.

Medalists

Men

The medals have been swept four times, something which is no longer possible under current rules: by the United States in 1904, Switzerland in 1924, Finland in 1948, and the Soviet Union in 1952. There have been three-way ties for gold twice (still possible but very unlikely under current rules): 1948 and 1988.

Multiple medalists

The most successful Olympian on pommel horse is Max Whitlock of Great Britain with two gold medals, in 2016 and 2020, and a bronze in 2012. He shares the title of most decorated Olympian on the apparatus, with three Olympic medals, with close contemporary and compatriot Louis Smith with two silvers and a bronze, and Romanian gymnast Marius Urzică, with one gold medal and two silvers. Three other gymnasts have won the gold medal twice, Soviet Boris Shakhlin, Yugoslav Miroslav Cerar and Hungarian legend Zoltán Magyar.

Medalists by country

Gallery

References

Pommel horse
Pommel horse at the Olympics